Brendon Feddema (born 14 May 1974) is an Australian rules footballer who played for the Fremantle Dockers between 1996 and 1998. He was drafted from East Fremantle in the WAFL as a zone selection in the 1995 AFL Draft and played mainly as a key forward.

He had previously played basketball with Regis University in the United States.

References

External links

1974 births
Fremantle Football Club players
East Fremantle Football Club players
Living people
Australian rules footballers from Western Australia
Peel Thunder Football Club players